East Tamworth is a suburb of Tamworth, New South Wales, Australia, in the city's east. It is located between the suburbs of North Tamworth, Tamworth CBD and the satellite suburb of Nemingha. East Tamworth is one of the oldest settled areas of Tamworth, and therefore is known for its wide streets and historical buildings and homes. Many of these historical buildings are the highest valued properties in Tamworth. East Tamworth is home to ANZAC Park, Tamworth Public School, St Nicholas Primary School and Calrossy Anglican School.

Socio-economic status
East Tamworth is considered to be the highest socio-economic area of Tamworth because of property values in the suburb.

Demographics
Of these: 
 Age distribution: Residents had a slightly older distribution of ages than the country overall.  The median age was 41 years, compared to the national median of 37 years. Children aged under 15 years made up 17.8% of the population (national average is 19.3%) and people aged 65 years and over made up 18.7% of the population (national average is 14.0%).
  Ethnic diversity :  86.5% of residents were born in Australia, compared to the national average of 70%; the next most common countries of birth were England 1.6%, New Zealand 0.8%, India 0.4%, United States of America 0.4% and South Africa 0.3%.  At home, 91.4% of residents only spoke English; the next most common languages spoken at home were Mandarin 0.3%, Greek 0.2%, Cantonese 0.2%, Dutch 0.2% and Korean 0.2%.
 Finances: The median household weekly income was $1,161, compared to the national median of $1,234. This difference is also reflected in real estate, with the median mortgage payment being $1,408 per month, compared to the national median of $1,800.
 Transport: On the day of the Census, 0.6% of employed people travelled to work on public transport and 73.4% by car (either as driver or as passenger).
 Housing: Of occupied private dwellings in East Tamworth (State Suburbs), 83% were separate houses, 13% were flats, units or apartments and 3% were semi-detached (row or terrace houses, townhouses). The average household size was 2.3 people.

Schools

Tamworth Public School
 St Nicholas Primary School
 Calrossy Anglican School

References

Suburbs of Tamworth, New South Wales